Murumulla Sriram (born 21 September 1992) is an Indian first-class cricketer who plays for Andhra Pradesh.

References

External links
 

1992 births
Living people
Indian cricketers
Andhra cricketers
Cricketers from Visakhapatnam